Portville Free Library, formerly the Smith Parish House, is a historic library building located at Portville in Cattaraugus County, New York. The original house was built for early Portville settler Smith Parish in 1847 as a two-story, three bay dwelling in the Greek Revival style.  It was subsequently expanded in the 1860s with a one-story, one bay wing.  The building became the Portville Free Library in 1909 and expanded in 1915, in 1930, and finally in 1960.

It was listed on the National Register of Historic Places in 1991.

References

External links
Portville Free Library website

Libraries on the National Register of Historic Places in New York (state)
Greek Revival architecture in New York (state)
Houses completed in 1847
Buildings and structures in Cattaraugus County, New York
1847 establishments in New York (state)
National Register of Historic Places in Cattaraugus County, New York